John Patrick Donohue, M.S.M. posthumous (June 4, 1931 – April 16, 2003) was an American-Canadian basketball coach. Donohue was the head coach of the senior Canadian men's national basketball team for 16 years, and he led them to several international successes. He was inducted into the FIBA Hall of Fame, in 2013.

Coaching career
Donohue served as a basketball coach for St. Nicholas of Tolentine High School. He then served as the head coach of Power Memorial Academy, from 1959 to 1965. At Power Memorial, Donohue had a career win–loss record of 163–30, including winning 71 straight games with the star center of his team, Lew Alcindor (later known as Kareem Abdul-Jabbar). Donohue's 1963–64 Power Memorial team was named, "The High School Team of The Century".

Donohue went on to work as the head coach of the College of the Holy Cross, from 1965 to 1972. With Holy Cross, he compiled a record of 106–66.

Donohue was also the head basketball coach of the senior men's Canadian national basketball team, from 1972 to 1988. Donohue coached Canada at three Summer Olympic Games (in 1976, 1984, and 1988), highlighted by two fourth-place finishes in 1976 and 1984. He also coached Canada at the 1974 FIBA World Championship, the 1978 FIBA World Championship, the 1982 FIBA World Championship, and the 1986 FIBA World Championship.

With Canada, Donohue won the silver medal at the 1980 Tournament of the Americas. He also won bronze medals at the 1984 Tournament of the Americas and the 1988 Tournament of the Americas. He also led the Canadian national university team to the gold medal at the 1983 Summer Universiade, and the bronze medal at the 1985 Summer Universiade.

Awards and accomplishments
Inducted into the Canadian Olympic Hall of Fame: 1991
Inducted into the Canadian Basketball Hall of Fame: 1992
Inducted into the Ontario Basketball Hall of Fame: 2000
Inducted into the New York State Basketball Hall of Fame: 2002
Inducted into the Canadian Disability Hall of Fame: 2003
Meritorious Service Decoration (Canada): 2004
Inducted into Canada's Sports Hall of Fame: 2004
Inducted into the FIBA Hall of Fame: 2013

Personal life
Donohue was married to Mary–Jane Donohue, who was lovingly referred to as his "bride", in 1963. Donohue died from pancreatic cancer, in Ottawa, Ontario, on 16 April 2003.

See also

Archives 
There is a John Jack Donohue fonds at Library and Archives Canada. The archival reference number is R15842.

References

External links
Sports-Reference.com Profile
Canadian Sports Hall of Fame Profile
Canadian Basketball Hall of Fame Profile
Ontario Basketball Hall of Fame Profile

1931 births
2003 deaths
American men's basketball coaches
American expatriate basketball people in Canada
Canadian men's basketball coaches
Holy Cross Crusaders men's basketball coaches
FIBA Hall of Fame inductees
Fordham Rams men's basketball coaches
Fordham University alumni
High school basketball coaches in the United States
New York University alumni 
Sportspeople from New York City
Canadian Disability Hall of Fame